Pakistan Technology Evaluation Satellite (PakTES-1A) is an indigenously developed remote sensing satellite of Space and Upper Atmosphere Research Commission. It was developed by SUPARCO while payload manufacturing was subcontracted to South Africa's Space Advisory Company. It has 300 Kilogram Mass. It was launched on board a Chinese Long March 2C rocket on 9 July 2018.

See also 
Pakistan Remote Sensing Satellite
SUPARCO

References 

2018 in Pakistan
Spacecraft launched in 2018
SUPARCO satellites
Earth observation satellites of Pakistan